Tetragonoderus taeniatus is a species of beetle in the family Carabidae. It was described by Wiedemann in 1823.

References

Beetles described in 1823
taeniatus